Charles E. Graham (1865–1948) was an American film actor of the silent era.

Selected filmography
 Arizona (1913)
 The $5,000,000 Counterfeiting Plot (1914)
 A Modern Magdalen (1915)
 The Curious Conduct of Judge Legarde (1915)
 The Bondman (1916)
 The Auction Block (1917)
 The Tides of Fate (1917)
 My Own United States (1918)
 The Wall Street Mystery (1920)
 The Song of the Soul (1920)
 The Headless Horseman (1922)
 Dawn of Revenge (1922)
 Gateway to the West (1924)
 The Making of O'Malley (1925)
 The Untamed Lady (1926)

References

Bibliography
 Ken Wlaschin. Silent Mystery and Detective Movies: A Comprehensive Filmography. McFarland, 2009.

External links

1865 births
1948 deaths
American male film actors
People from Maryland
19th-century American people
20th-century American actors